Morgan is a name of Welsh and Breton origin. Traditionally, it is a masculine-coded name in Wales and Brittany, but has been decoupled from its traditional gender outside of its regions of origin. Morgan is also used as a surname, derived from the given name.

The name is a descendant of Old Welsh Morcant, possibly derived from môr (meaning "sea") and "cant" (the circle) or "gen" (come / origin) with the meaning: "sea chief", "sea protector", "sea defender" or "sailor/captain". Contemporaneous records of the first Mormaer, or count de Mar, spelled his name Morggán, Earl of Mar.

The use of the name for women may be inspired by the character Morgan le Fay from Arthurian legend. For the etymology of Morgan le Fay, see .

Morgan as a first name originated in Wales and Brittany, but spread in popularity outside of Welsh and Breton communities during the past century, including in France, and in English-speaking countries worldwide.

In the United States it is commonly used for any gender, although it has become a more popular name for women than men since the 1990s, possibly due to conflation with the popular name Megan. The name is also used for any gender in other English-speaking countries, including Canada, Australia, the United Kingdom and New Zealand. The French feminine version of the name is Morgane.

Notable people

Female
Morgan Andrews (born 1995), American soccer player
Morgan Brittany (born 1951), American actress
Morgan Fairchild (born 1950), American actress
Morgan Featherstone (born 1994), Australian fashion model
Morgan Gautrat (born 1993), American soccer player
Morgan Hurd (born 2001), American gymnast
Morgan James (born 1981), American musician
Morgan Joanel, Australian pop singer-songwriter and visual artist
Morgan Pressel (born 1988), American professional golfer
Morgan Romano (born 1998), American model and beauty queen 
Morgan Tuck (born 1994), American basketball player
Morgan Webb (born 1978), American television presenter and producer
Morgan White (born 1983), American gymnast
Morgan William (born 1996), American basketball player

Male
Morgan (bishop), Bishop-elect of Durham in 1215 and illegitimate son of King Henry II of England
Morgan De Sanctis (born 1977), Italian soccer player
Morgan Earp (1851–1882), American lawman, brother of Wyatt Earp
Morgan Ensberg (born 1975), American baseball player
Morgan M. Finley (1925–2016), American politician and businessman
Morgan Fisher (born 1950), British musician and photographer
Morgan Freeman (born 1937), American actor, director, and narrator
Morgan Green (born 1987), American footballer
Morgan Grim (born 1988), American basketball player
Morgan Hamm (born 1982), American gymnast
Morgan Johansson (born 1970), Swedish politician
Morgan Jones (disambiguation), several people
Morgan Luttrell (born 1975), American politician
Morgan Nicholls (born 1971), English musician
Morgan Philips Price (1885–1973), British politician
Morgan Phillips (1902–1963), General Secretary of the British Labour Party
Morgan Rielly (born 1994), Canadian ice hockey player
Morgan Sanson (born 1994), French soccer player
Morgan Schneiderlin (born 1989), French soccer player
Morgan Spurlock (born 1970), American filmmaker, screenwriter and producer
Morgan Stevens (1951–2022), American actor
Morgan Tsvangirai (1952–2018), prime minister of Zimbabwe
Morgan Ward (1901–1963), American mathematician
Morgan Wootten (1931–2020), American basketball coach

Fictional characters
Morgan le Fay, a powerful enchantress in the Arthurian legend
Morgan Jones, a character in The Walking Dead franchise
Morgan the Midnight Fairy, a character in the book series Rainbow Magic

See also 
Morggán, Earl of Mar, 12th century Scottish nobleman

References

English masculine given names
English feminine given names
Irish unisex given names
Scottish masculine given names
Welsh unisex given names
English unisex given names
English-language unisex given names